The Kampfpanzer Leopard 1 (also styled Leopard I, before the Leopard 2 simply known as the Kampfpanzer Leopard) is a main battle tank designed by Porsche and manufactured by Krauss-Maffei in West Germany, first entering service in 1965. Developed in an era when HEAT warheads were thought to make conventional heavy armour of limited value, the Leopard design focused on effective firepower and mobility instead of heavy protection. It featured moderate armour, only effective against low caliber autocannons and heavy machine guns, giving it a high power-to-weight ratio. This, coupled with a modern suspension and drivetrain, gave the Leopard superior mobility and cross-country performance compared to most other main battle tanks of the era, only being rivaled by the French AMX-30 and Swedish Strv 103. The main armament of the Leopard consisted of a German license-built version of the British Royal Ordnance L7 105 mm rifled gun, one of the most effective and widespread tank guns of the era.

The design started as a collaborative project during the 1950s between West Germany and France, and later joined by Italy, but the partnership ended shortly after and the final design was ordered by the Bundeswehr, with full-scale production starting in 1965. In total, 6,485 Leopard tanks have been built, of which 4,744 were battle tanks and 1,741 were utility and anti-aircraft variants, not including 80 prototypes and pre-series vehicles.

The Leopard quickly became a standard of many European militaries, and eventually served as the main battle tank in over a dozen countries worldwide, with West Germany, Italy and the Netherlands being the largest operators until their retirement. Since 1990, the Leopard 1 has gradually been relegated to secondary roles in most armies. In the German Army, the Leopard 1 was completely phased out in 2003 by the Leopard 2, while Leopard 1-based vehicles are still widely used in utility roles.

The Leopard 2 has replaced the Leopard 1 in service with many other nations, with derived vehicles using the Leopard 1 hull still seeing service. Currently, the largest operators are Greece, with 520 vehicles, Turkey, with 397 vehicles, Brazil with 378 vehicles and Chile with 202 vehicles. Most of these vehicles have been upgraded with various improvements to armour, firepower and sensors to maintain their ability to engage modern threats.

Development history

Leopard 1 

The Leopard project started in November 1956 in order to develop a modern tank, the Standard-Panzer, to replace the Bundeswehr's American-built M47 and M48 Patton tanks, which, though just delivered to West Germany's recently reconstituted army, were rapidly becoming outdated. On 25 July 1957, the detailed specifications were released. The new design needed to weigh no more than 30 tonnes, have a power-to-weight ratio of 30 horsepower per tonne, be able to withstand hits by 20 mm rapid-fire guns on every side as well as to operate in a battlefield contaminated with chemical weapons or radioactive fallout, the then-standard baseline for combat with the Warsaw Pact.

The main armament had to consist of a 105 mm caliber weapon (the new British L7A3 105 mm gun was selected), carrying at least as many rounds as current US tank designs. Mobility had priority, while firepower came second. Armour was seen as less essential, as it was believed that no real protection against hollow charge weapons was possible anyway. At the time it was suspected that future conflicts would involve nuclear weapons, which no tank at the time could directly protect from.

France was very interested in the design as its own AMX 50 project had just failed. In June 1957, West Germany and the French Fourth Republic signed an agreement to develop a common tank, designated in German Europa-Panzer. Three German (Arbeitsgruppe A, B and C) and one French design team were included in a competition, with each team producing two prototypes. In September 1958, Italy joined the development program. Several prototypes were entered for testing in 1960. Among the prototypes were Porsche's Model 734 from team A, sporting a cast turret, and that of team B (Rheinmetall), whose cast turret was somewhat higher. Team C from Borgward, designing a very futuristic tank, failed to have a prototype ready in time.

Even before these first prototypes were finished, it had (in 1959) been decided that a second phase with improved designs would be started: Team A had to build 26 phase II prototypes for testing, team B six. Only two tanks of the required six were constructed by team B.

The Porsche Prototype II was eventually selected as the winner of the contest in 1963. This did not come as a surprise: it had already been decided in 1961 to build a pre-series of 50 vehicles based on this design. Production of these was started that very year. This "0-series" was modified with a new cast turret and several hull changes to raise the rear deck to provide more room in the engine compartment and move some of the radiators to the upper sides of the hull. Before mass production of the standard version started, it was decided to add an optical range-finding system for better long-range gunnery, which required the turret to be somewhat taller, and added "bumps" on either side of the turret to mount the optics for triangulation. Germany dropped France from the joint program after France repeatedly missed deadlines for its contribution to the program.

In February 1963 Defence Minister Kai-Uwe von Hassel announced he would soon ask the defense committee in Parliament to approve production of the tank. At this time the tank weighed 40 tons and cost $250,000 each. In July the Defence Ministry ordered 1,500 tanks with production to take place between 1965 and 1970. Germany also announced its agreement to develop a successor with the United States. Called the MBT-70, the program failed to materialize a tenable design.

Production was set up at KraussMaffei of Munich from early 1964 onward, with deliveries of the first batch between September 1965 and July 1966. The Leopard was soon being purchased from Germany by a number of NATO members and other allies, including (in chronological order) Belgium (1968), the Netherlands (1969), Norway (1970), Italy (1971), Denmark (1976), Australia (1976), Canada (1978), Turkey (1980) and Greece (1981). It is also key to note that Germany has a strict export-policy for their military equipment. Greece, Spain and Chile, while still under dictatorships, purchased the French AMX-30 instead.

Leopard 1A1 

After the first batch was delivered, the next three batches were the Leopard 1A1 model, which included a new gun stabilization system from Cadillac Gage that allowed the tank to fire effectively on the move. The 1A1 added the now-famous "skirts" along the sides to protect the upper tracks, and a new thermal jacket on the gun barrel to control heating. A less important change was to use rectangular rubber blocks fastened to the treads with a single pin instead of the earlier two-pin "shaped" versions. The rubber blocks could be easily replaced with metal X-shaped crampons for movement on ice and snow in the winter.

Between 1974 and 1977, all of the machines in the first four batches were brought to the same Leopard 1A1A1 standard, and given additional turret armour developed by Blohm & Voss.  An upgrade in the 1980s added leftover image-intensifier night sights, which were being handed down from the Leopard 2 as they were themselves upgraded. The PZB 200 image intensification system was mounted in a large box on the upper right of the gun, creating the Leopard 1A1A2. An upgrade with SEM80/90 all-digital radios created the Leopard 1A1A3. Later improvements to the image intensifier created the Leopard 1A1A4.

Leopard 1A2 

The first 232 tanks of the fifth production batch were delivered as the Leopard 1A2 between 1972 and 1974. The A2 included a heavier and better armoured turret, and therefore did not receive the B&V armour add-ons as did the earlier machines. They received the other upgrades; the Leopard 1A2A1 received the PZB 200, the Leopard 1A2A2 received digital radios, and the Leopard 1A2A3 got both.

Leopard 1A3 
The next 110 vehicles in the fifth batch were fitted with a new welded turret, which was equipped with a new armour consisting of two spaced steel plates with a plastic filling between them (high-hardness armour), and a wedge-shaped gun mantlet, creating the Leopard 1A3. Although the level of armour area density was equivalent to the A2's new welded version, the internal volume was increased by 1.2 m³ and the effective protection level was increased by half. The improved TRP 2A independent sight was installed for the commander. Upgrades were identical to the 1A2 models, the Leopard 1A3A1 with the night sights, Leopard 1A3A2 with the new radios, and the Leopard 1A3A3 with both.

Leopard 1A4 
The Leopard 1A4 formed the sixth batch of 250 vehicles, starting delivery in 1974. The 1A4 was externally similar to the 1A3, but included a new computerized fire control system and the new EMES 12A1 sighting system to aim it. The commander was provided with his own independent night sighting system, the PERI R12. The new equipment used up space and the ammunition load was reduced to 55 rounds, of which 42 were stored in the magazine to the left of the driver.

Leopard 1A5 

In 1980, a research program was undertaken to study further improvements to the Leopard 1, providing it with a completely modern fire control system and fully effective night/bad-weather vision system. The decision was made to base the upgrades on the earlier models, which were no longer competitive.

The resulting Leopard 1A5 was based on 1,225 vehicles of the Leopard 1A1A1 model. The turrets were again modified for the 1A5, both in order to store all of the new equipment, as well as to move more of the ammunition into the rear of the turret, as opposed to the left side of the driver where it had previously been stored. The new turret was able to mount the newer 120 mm gun from the Leopard 2 if desired, although this option has not been used.

After trials, the Krupp-Atlas Elektronik EMES 18 fire control system, which was developed from the EMES 15 used on the Leopard 2, was selected in December 1983. The EMES 18 included two new sights on the top of the turret, and no longer required the "bumps" as the earlier optical systems did. A crucial part of the upgrade was the introduction of more effective ammunition, including new APFSDS rounds.

The Leopard tank could be fitted with bolt-on polycarbonate (Lexan) armour panels, which have increased the effectiveness of the armour.  The first modified vehicle was delivered in early 1987. Since then, almost all users of the Leopard 1 have applied similar changes to their own vehicles, and in most ways the 1A5 can be considered the "standard" Leopard 1 today.

In the Netherlands, an improved version equivalent to the A5 called "Leopard 1 Verbeterd" (improved) was developed. The same version is still in service with the Chilean Army.

Leopard 1A6 
The Leopard 1A6 prototype was a single Leopard 1 A1A1 testbed, modified with additional armour on the turret and equipped with a 120 mm L/44 gun.  The project was ended in 1987, as the Leopard 2 was in widespread service at this point and the 1A5 offered a more reasonable upgrade path for a fraction of the cost.

Modified and derivative vehicles  

Simultaneous to the production of the battle tanks, a number of engineering, bridging and recovery vehicles were developed, as well as a number of versions used in the anti-aircraft role.

The most well known Leopard variants are the Bridgelayer "Biber" (Beaver), "Bergepanzer 2" armoured recovery vehicle, "Pionierpanzer 2 Dachs" (Badger) armoured engineer vehicle and the "Gepard" self-propelled anti-aircraft gun. The Warsaw Pact equivalent of the Gepard is the ZSU-23-4. Marconi Electronic Systems once offered conversions to the Marksman SPAAG for existing users of the Leopard 1. The Leopard 1 chassis would be used to carry the Marksman turret.

The Canadian Army operates the Beaver Armoured vehicle-launched bridge, Taurus ARV, and Badger AEV, all based on the Leopard 1.

The United Kingdom's Royal Marines operate a vehicle known as the Hippo beach armoured recovery vehicle. The Hippo is a conversion of a Leopard 1A5 chassis by Alvis Moelv. The main alteration has been the replacement of the turret with a raised superstructure that resembles the wheelhouse of a boat. The original 830 hp (634 kW) diesel engine has been retained, but the gearing of the transmission had been lowered, reducing the vehicle's road speed to 32 km/h (20 mph), but increasing tractive effort to 250 kN (56,000 lbf).

Other modifications include the addition of working platforms, a nosing block, raised air intakes and an Auxiliary power unit. This raised the weight of the vehicle from 42.5 tonnes to 50 tonnes. The Hippo has a fording depth of 2.95 m (10 ft) and can pull vehicles up to 50 tonnes weight or push off from the beach a 240 tonne displacement landing craft.

Gilded Leopard, Eber and Keiler 
Almost as soon as the Leopard was introduced into service in 1965, Porsche was awarded a contract to study further improvements to the existing design, while awaiting deliveries of the MBT-70 in the mid-1970s. This original Gilded Leopard (vergoldeter Leopard) program expired in 1967 with no production order. In 1967, it had already become obvious that the MBT-70 would be a failure. The agreement between the US and the Federal Republic of Germany forbade any national development of an MBT apart from technological experimentation, so a new tank project was begun under the designation of Experimentalentwicklung or "experimental development", two prototypes of which were built.

When the MBT-70 program was ended, a further contract was offered under the name Boar (Eber), with an emphasis on using as many technologies from the MBT-70 as possible, but without the problematic XM150 152 mm (6.0 in) combined gun/MGM-51 Shillelagh missile launcher.  Two prototype vehicles were constructed using a new chassis from Porsche with the road wheels from the MBT-70 and the original Leopard engine. This was combined with a new Wegmann turret, mounting the MBT-70's Rheinmetall 120 mm smoothbore gun. Some also mounted the original 105 mm L7.

These were considered promising enough that seven more were ordered, this time powered by the MTU engine designed for the MBT-70. When this happened, the Experimentalentwicklung team went public with their alternative design which they called the Keiler (a synonym of Eber). In 1971, the minister of defence, Helmut Schmidt, decided to abandon the Eber-project and build 17 prototypes of a Leopard 2, based on the Keiler design, which had a turret with spaced sloped armour. The maximum weight was to be 50 tonnes.

During the 1973 Yom Kippur War, 1950s and 1960s generation tanks were badly beaten by wire-guided missiles, and it was realized that dramatically improved armour protection was needed. The decision was made to allow the tank to increase its weight to the next classification, Military Loading Class 60 (tonnes). A new design effort was started, with the spaced armour replaced with a much denser perforated armour assemblage. The new design would go on to augment and, after the Cold War, sometimes replace the Leopard in many countries' armies.

Operational history

Australia 

In 1974, the Australian government confirmed the purchase of the Leopard, with a total of 101 vehicles being acquired, consisting of 90 MBTs, five Bridgelayers and six Armoured Recovery Vehicles. Two more ARVs were purchased later. The first Leopards arrived in Australia from Germany in 1976, ending a selection and trial process against the US M60 series that started in 1971, when the army decided it needed a replacement for its British Centurions, which had served since 1952 and had been deployed during the Vietnam war.

In March 2004, the decision was made to replace the Leopard 1 with reconditioned US M1A1 Abrams AIM. The first 18 of 59 M1A1 Abrams arrived in September 2006. The M88A2 Hercules is concurrently replacing the Leopard family of support variants in Australian service. The Leopard 1 was operated by the 1st Armoured Regiment and was officially withdrawn from service in July 2007. Their guns were never fired in combat operations. Some of the retired tanks were offered to military museums or RSL clubs.

Belgium 
The Belgian Army received 334 Leopard 1BE between 1968 and 1971. They equipped eight tank regiments, each equipped with 40 Leopards, and the Armour School. The first regiment to receive the Leopard was the 4th Lancers, followed by the 1st Lancers, 2nd Lancers, 3rd Lancers, 8th Lancers, 1st Guides, 2nd Guides and finally the 2nd Mounted Rifles. From 1974, they were modified with a gun stabilization system and an Automatic firing direction system (Automatisch VuurLeidingsSysteem, AVLS) from SABCA. This system allowed the gun to fire on the move.

In 1984, the Army Command decided to upgrade 132 Leopard to the A5 standard as Leopard 1A5(BE). At the end of the Cold War, there was a drastic cut in the number of tanks and 128 were sold to Brazil. The upgrade started in 1993 and was completed in 1997. The upgrade included a new gun firing direction system with thermal imaging, a laser rangefinder and a muzzle reference system. At that time, four regiments were still equipped with the Leopard 1A5(BE). At the end of the 1990s, the remaining four regiments amalgamated into two tank regiments, the 1st/3rd Lancers and the 2nd/4th Lancers. In 2010, the 2nd/4th Lancers was disbanded.

Around 40 Leopard 1A5(BE) were kept operational in the 1st/3rd Lancers and Carabiniers Prins Boudewijn – Grenadiers. The 1st/3rd Lancers is no longer a tank regiment, but a medium infantry battalion, identical to the rest of the medium infantry battalions of the Belgian Army except for having a single squadron of Leopard 1A5(BE). Belgian Leopards have served in Kosovo. In 2014, following the government's decision to replace all Land Component tracked vehicles (Leopards, AIFV, and M113) with PIRANHA DF90s, Belgian Leopards were retired from service with most tanks being put on display, used for target practice, or sold inoperable to a Belgian company.

During Eurosatory 2022, John Cockerill offered the Cockerill Medium Tank 3105 upgrade package for Leopard 1 tanks. The prototype for the upgrade integrated the hull of the Leopard 1A5(BE) with a Cockerill 3105 turret. The only modification to the hull is the installation of an adaptor ring for the new turret and an electronic cable. The turret is armed with a 105 mm Cockerill 105HP with a 12-round autoloader and a 7.62 mm coaxial machine gun, with both thermal and day sights. The installation of the new turret reduces the tank's weight by 5 tonnes and the tank crew to 3 personnel. The prototype was converted at the John Cockerill facility in Aubange and underwent firing tests at the Suippes military base in March 2022.

The Belgian Army also had the following variants:
 36 armoured recovery vehicles (ARV – TRV)
 17 Pionier tanks (armoured engineers)
 55 Gepard anti-aircraft tanks (withdrawn from service)
 12 driving school tanks
 9 Leguan AVLB (armoured vehicle-launched bridge)

Canada 

As a replacement for the Centurion Tank, Canada acquired 114 Leopard C1 tanks (equivalent to Leopard 1A3 with laser rangefinder) in 1978–79 for its Land Forces. Most of these tanks were stationed in Germany during the Cold War, with a few retained at Canadian Forces Base Gagetown, New Brunswick for training. In 1976, prior to delivery of these new Leopards, the Canadian government leased 35 Leopard 1A2 tanks from the contractor in order to begin training crews from the 4 Canadian Mechanized Brigade Group (4CMBG) based in West Germany. These tanks equipped the Royal Canadian Dragoons (RCD) that competed against other NATO tank crews and won the Canadian Army Tank competition in 1977.

While investigating the possibilities of increasing the Leopards' armour prior to a refit, the turret armour on close-up inspection was 1.5-inch + turret wall cast 0.75-inch steel, the 'belly' armour was approx. 2.25-inch + cast frame steel 0.75-inch steel, skirt covering treads (tracks) was 1-inch rubber – not steel. Additional armour was applied on the forward half of the skirt during the refit as well as increased 0.6-inch steel on the upper hull sides and 1.1-inch steel on the upper Glacis – although only a small handful of C1s received a complete refit.

The refit included adding thermal night-vision equipment. Five or six Leopard C1 tanks had an extremely thick MEXAS appliqué armour kit applied, made by German firm IBD Deisenroth Engineering. These tanks, designated Leopard C1 MEXAS, served with Lord Strathcona's Horse (Royal Canadians) in the 1999 KFOR mission in Kosovo. They were later upgraded with the same sights and fire-control system as the Leopard C2 (see below).

Starting in 1996, the 114 Leopard C1 tanks in service were due to be upgraded to the Leopard 1A5 standard, designated as the Leopard C2, at a cost of CA$139 million. The turrets of 123 surplus Leopard 1A5 tanks purchased from the German Defence Ministry were fitted into the existing hulls (nine turrets were reserved for spare parts and training), and the German tank hulls sold back to the upgrade contractor. For the process, the original Leopard 1A3 turrets had their main armament removed first, then were removed from the original C1 hulls. The modified Leopard 1A5 turrets were then fitted onto the C1 hulls. The removed L7A3 105mm guns were refitted onto the new turrets. Due to the complexity of the upgrade process, of the 114 tanks, 66 tanks were successfully upgraded. The first updated Leopards, now named the Leopard C2, entered service in November 1999, at CFB Gagetown, New Brunswick.

The Leopard C2's turret was modified according to the Canadian Army's request, with new radios being installed, and new stowage containers being fitted to the rear of the turret. Aside from the requested add-ons, the biggest update for the Canadian Leopard tank fleet was the implementation of the Atlas-Elektronik EMES-18 Fire Control System module, which featured a similar computerized setup as the C1's SABCA FCS, a laser rangefinder, and thermal imager. Eighteen Leopard Crew Gunnery Trainers were purchased at the same time.

Canada also operates the Leopard 1-based Beaver armoured bridgelayer vehicle and Taurus armoured recovery vehicle, bought with the original Leopard C1, and the Badger armoured engineer vehicle with a dozer blade and excavator bucket, which entered service in 1990.

A number of the Canadian Leopard tanks were pulled out of service during the mid-2000s in anticipation of replacing them with the eight-wheeled Mobile Gun System. These plans were put on hold after US experience revealed serious shortcomings related to stability and weight. Of the obsolescent tanks, 23 were sold to companies in North America, four put in museums or used as monuments, including two at the Bovington Tank Museum, and 21 used as hard targets on ranges.

Canada sent a squadron of Lord Strathcona's Horse (Royal Canadians) to Afghanistan in the fall of 2006, equipped with 17 Leopard C2 tanks with the MEXAS add-on armour, as well as four recovery vehicles and four engineering vehicles. The armoured squadron was intended to provide convoy protection, supporting Canada's Provincial Reconstruction Teams and other organizations equipped with lighter vehicles, and combat operations. The first tanks arrived in Kandahar in mid-October 2006. On 2 December 2006, the Leopards stationed in Kandahar entered the field, marking the first time since the Korean War that a Canadian armoured squadron had sent tanks into an active war zone. They fired their guns in combat for the first time in as many years the following day, in response to a Taliban rocket attack.

The deployed tank squadron was in combat operations from late 2006 until July 2011. The first squadron deployed with C2 MEXAS. In mid July 2007, a thermal cover and a cooling unit with crew vests was added to the tanks. The tank squadron was augmented in mid September 2007 with the 20 Leopard 2A6Ms with slat bar type armour. The Barracuda system was added in mid-2008. In late 2010, the tank squadron added five of the new Leopard 2A4Ms. The tank squadron operated with the three different Leopards until it was pulled from combat operations. The C2 MEXAS with the mine ploughs, mine rollers and the dozers were used alongside the Leopard 2's, until a bracket was installed for the Leopard 2A6M to mount them.

After an initial assessment of the performance of the Leopard C2 in Afghanistan, Canada decided to invest in Leopard 2 tanks. It was determined that the lack of adequate air conditioning, essential in the searing heat of Afghanistan, was degrading the tank crew's war fighting ability. The Army later downplayed this factor, citing increased armour protection and the main gun armament as reasons for upgrading to the Leopard 2. After some public speculation, Canadian Defence Minister Hon. Gordon O'Connor clarified the situation in April 2007.

To meet immediate needs in Afghanistan, 20 of the Bundeswehr's stock of Leopard 2A6s were upgraded to the 2A6M standard and loaned to Canada at no cost by the German government. Two Leopard 2 Büffel Armoured Recovery Vehicles were acquired at the same time. These vehicles were shipped from Germany to Afghanistan, with the first arriving on 16 August 2007.

For the long term, Canada plans to replace the borrowed Leopard 2 tanks with a purchase of 100 surplus vehicles from the Netherlands, including 20 Leopard 2A6Ms for combat service, 40 Leopard 2A4s for training, and 20 support vehicles, such as Armoured Recovery Vehicles, Bridge-Layers and Armoured Engineer vehicles.

The older Leopard C2 tanks were considered completely obsolete by 2015, but specific plans for them have not yet been announced. Until deployment with the Canadian Forces in Afghanistan, the Leopard 1 C2 had never seen active combat.

In February 2018, Canada attempted to sell the surplus Leopard 1C2 tanks to the Jordanian Armed Forces. In July, it was announced that the plan to sell the older Leopard tanks to Jordan fell through and the Canadian Department of National Defence has yet to decide what to do with the surplus vehicles. Daniel Le Bouthillier, a spokesperson for the Canadian Department of National Defense, said "the last option would be to destroy the tanks."

As of November, 2021, no buyer was found for the Canadian Army's Leopard 1C2 tanks, "About 45 retired Canadian Army tanks will soon be used for target practice at the Cold Lake Air Weapons Range." A Vegreville Alberta company, Quest Disposal & Recycling Inc., was contracted to repurpose them to be used for target practice at Cold Lake Air Weapons Range, and the tanks were at the company's site being processed in December 2021.

Denmark 

In 1976, Denmark acquired 120 Leopard 1A3 tanks, which were designated Leopard 1 DK. Delivery was completed in 1978. In 1992, Denmark acquired another 110 1A3 tanks, partly through Conventional Forces Europe treaty AFV reduction requirements. These tanks were upgraded to Leopard 1A5-DK, along with the first 120 Leopards. Being fitted with the welded turret of the Leopard 1A3, the Danish Leopard 1A5-DK tanks were not identical to the German Leopard 1A5, which were fitted with the cast turrets. Denmark had 230 Leopard 1A5-DKs in service from 1993, until their retirement and complete replacement by the Leopard 2A5-DK tanks in 2005.

These Leopards were involved in one of the most important engagements in modern Danish military history, which became known as Operation Bøllebank. Denmark was the only Scandinavian country to send a significant tank force to support their peacekeeping operations in Croatia and Bosnia. On 29 April 1994 near the city of Tuzla seven Danish Leopard 1A5 tanks were involved in a skirmish between UNPROFORs Nordic Battalion (NORDBAT 2) and Bosnian-Serb military forces from the Šekovići brigade. The tanks were sent out to relieve a Swedish-manned observation post that had come under ambush fire by the Bosnian-Serb forces. Upon the tanks arrival at the observation post they were shelled by mortar fire and anti-tank rockets, which led the UN marked and white-painted Leopard 1A5 tanks to return fire. No casualties were suffered by Swedish observation post nor the Danish tank. Serbian casualties were estimated as high as 150 soldiers. This is believed to be the first hostile engagement involving the Leopard 1 tank.

The Danish Army had/has the following variants:

120 Leopard 1A3 (1976-1993) All upgraded into 1A5
230 Leopard 1A5 (1993-2005) (120(from 1976) + 110 "new A5") 
16 Berger ARV (1993-2011) All Upgraded into FFG Wisent's (10 ARV + 6 AEV)
10 FFG Wisent ARV (2011– present)
4 FFG Wisent AEV Mine clearing vehicle (2011 – present)
2 FFG Wisent AEV (2011– present)
10 Biber AVLB (1994–2023)
6 driving school cabin (1976-?)

Greece 

Greece bought its first 104 Leopard 1A3 GR tanks during 1983–1984. They are actually Leopard 1A3s, but came with an EMES 12A3 FCS and some other modifications required by the Greek army at that time. During 1992, the Greek army received a batch of 75 Leopard 1A5 as offsets for the construction of 4 MEKO 200 frigates. Some months later, Greece received another batch of 170 Leopard 1V and 2 Leopard 1A5 from the Royal Netherlands army – the Leopard 1V is actually an 1A1A4 with an EMES 12A3 AFSL-2 FCS.

From 1998 until 2000, Greece bought 192 used Leopard 1A5s as offsets for the upgrade of the Greek F-4 aircraft in Germany in a symbolic price. In 2001, the Greek army decided to upgrade 104 Leopard 1A4GR and 120 Leopard 1V to the A5+ version, costing 234 million dollars. The programme was cancelled because Greece received a batch of 150 Leopard 1A5s along with the newly built Leopard 2A6 HEL. As of 2011, Greece is the largest user of Leopard 1 tanks, having over 500 Leopard 1A5 GR MBTs as well as many ST, Biber and Leguan versions.

Italy 

Italy had to replace an enormous amount of M47 Patton, with over 2,000 received from US stocks, but unlike other NATO members did not instigate a national project to achieve this. Its army, not entirely satisfied by the M60 Patton (300 delivered, of those 200 were produced by OTO-Melara), placed its first order for the Leopard 1 in 1970. 200 Leopard 1A1 and 69 Bergepanzer 2 were delivered between 1971 and 1972. The vehicles replaced the M47 in the Italian Army's Cavalry Brigade "Pozzuolo del Friuli".

A further 600 Leopard 1A2 and 67 Bergepanzer 2 were built in Italy by OTO Melara with deliveries starting in 1975, with a second batch of 120 build by OTO Melara between 1980 and 1983. All Italian-built Leopards were A2, but without stabilizer and skirts. The 200 A1s originally bought from Germany were partially upgraded lately at this standard. Forty Pionierleopard (AEV), nine school (for drivers, without armament) and 64 Biber (AVLB) were ordered in 1985. Twelve of the Pionierleopard were produced in Germany and 28 by OTO Melara in Italy. All of the Biber were assembled by OTO Melara in Italy.

By the end, Italy was the biggest customer of the Leopard outside Germany with 920 plus 250 special versions, the only one with a licence production, and the only country that produced both the M60 and Leopard 1. The Leopard was the basis for Italian MBTs and heavy artillery systems, starting with Leone/Lion and the following OF-40, leading to other developments like the Palmaria and OTOMATIC artillery systems (both on an OF-40 hull). The experience made possible the development of the C1 Ariete, after the Italian army decided in 1984 to have a new national tank, rather than buying 300 Leopard 2s.

At the end of the Cold War, the Italian Army began an upgrade and a downsizing of its armoured units. A number of Leopards were retired in 1991, along with its fleet of M60 tanks. In 1995, Italy bought 120 A5 surplus turrets from the Bundeswehr, which were mounted on the same number of reworked A2 hulls. These tanks took part in the various peacekeeping missions in the Balkans, never seeing action.

The last A1/A2 was retired in 2003, with the last A5 going in 2008, leaving the Ariete as the sole tank in Italian service. The AEVs, ARVs, and AVLBs have been reduced in number and some have been modified to work with the Ariete. They are stated to serve for some more years, as no replacement has been selected yet.

Lebanon 
Lebanon and Belgium finalized the transfer of 43 Leopard 1A5 tanks to the Lebanese Armed Forces in a deal worth 3.5 million euros, which also includes a number of ex-Belgian APCs. The purchased ex-Belgian APCs include 16 AIFV-B-C25s and 12 M113 armoured ambulances.
In 2008 a sale of 43 Leopard 1A5(BE) to Lebanon was concluded, but as of 2018 was not finalized due to "the absence of licensing for export from Germany."

Turkey 
The Turkish Army upgraded its Leopard 1 tanks to a version called the Leopard 1T 'Volkan'. The modernization program included the serial production and integration of the Volkan fire control system developed by ASELSAN. The new indigenous system provides the capability of detecting the targets in daylight or at night in all weather conditions and combat environments. It significantly increases the first round hit probability on the move and also improve the usage life over 20 years.

Current operators

Former operators 
  – 71; 90 Leopard 1A4s were originally delivered as Leopard AS1, later upgraded, and since replaced by 59 M1A1 Abrams from the US
  – 132 Leopard 1A5(BE)s; 334 originally; all are going to be replaced by 21 Mowag Piranha III with a 90 mm cannon.
  – 114 Leopard 1C tanks originally ordered (equivalent to Leopard 1A3 with laser rangefinder) and received in 1978–79. 66 upgraded to Leopard C2 (Leopard 1A5 equivalent), some with additional MEXAS armour kits. The Leopard C2 was in active service until 2017 and replaced with Leopard 2s. Efforts were made to sell the surplus Leopard 1 tanks to Jordan, but the deal fell through in 2018 and 11 tanks were given to museums. In 2021, around 45 of the remaining Leopard 1 tanks in storage were sent to Vegreville, Alberta to be converted into target pieces by Quest Disposal & Recycling Inc. Brückenlegepanzer "Beaver" AVLB retired from service around 2017, and Pionierpanzer 2 "Badger" AEV retired in 2018 and replaced with WISENT 2 "Ram" manufactured in New Brunswick by FFG's Canadian subsidiary. Bergepanzer 2 ARV "Taurus" was still present on the Government of Canada's list of Armed Forces equipment as of February 2021. Retired and replaced with Bergepanzer BPz3 "Mammoth".
  – 2,437 originally. Retired and replaced by the Leopard 2. Remaining Leopard 1 tanks are in long-term storage, at tank recycling facilities, or held by private defence companies for resale. As of 2023, Rheinmetall has 100 Leopard 1A5 tanks, 88 of which are suitable for service and are being retrofitted and sent to Ukraine. FFG has another 99 Leopard 1A5DK tanks purchased from Denmark in 2008; 90 of these being repurposed for transfer to Ukraine.

See also 
 Leopard 2
 Flakpanzer Gepard

Tanks of comparable role, performance and era 
 AMX-30: French main battle tank
 Chieftain: British main battle tank
 M60 Patton: US main battle tank
 Stridsvagn 103: Swedish main battle tank
 T-62: Soviet main battle tank
 Type 74: Japanese main battle tank

References 
Notes

Bibliography

 Hunnicutt, R. P. Patton: A History of the American Main Battle Tank. 1984, Presidio Press; .

 MacNeill, Marvin Craig The New Evil: Memories from Afghanistan 2006-2008. 2017, Trackpad Publishing .

 Smitt, Willem Dutch Leopard 1: Armoured Fist of the Royal Dutch Army. 2014, Trackpad Publishing .

 Cecil, Michael K. Leopard AS1: Leopard in Australian Service. 2015, Trackpad Publishing .

 Lobitz, Frank. The Leopard 1 MBT in German Army Service - Early Years. 2006, Tankograd Publishing.

 Lobitz, Frank. The Leopard 1 MBT in German Army Service - Late Years. 2006, Tankograd Publishing.

External links 

 Leopard 1 at Krauss-Maffei Wegmann
 Leopard 1 worldwide  at Scandinavian Armor
 Battle tank Leopard 1 A5 at FAS.org
Australian Leopard external links
 Acquiring Armour: Some Aspects of the Australian Army's Leopard Tank Purchase – Australian Army Journal, Vol.3(1), Summer 2005–6.
 Leopard 1 in Australia – Anzac Steel
 Australian plans to retire stocks
 Leopards being withdrawn from service – Official ceremony July, 2007.
Canadian Leopard external links
 Canadian Tanks to Kandahar: the Leopard C2 at CASR
 Passage to Panjwaii: Canadian Tanks Go to Afghanistan at CASR
 Assessing the Threats to CF Leopard Tanks in Afghanistan at CASR
 Punching at Panjwaii: Canadian Leopard Tanks in Combat at CASR – Dec 2006
 Leopard 2A4/2A6M Tanks for the Canadian Forces? at CASR
 Canadian Army: Leopard C2
 Leopard C2 at the Governor General's Horse Guard militia regiment
 Leopard C2 at the Lord Strathcona's Horse (Royal Canadians) regiment
 Canadian Leopard C2 walk-around
 Raw footage of Canadian Leopards in Kandahar, Afghanistan at Youtube.com
 Official DND/CF Backgrounder Renewing the Canadian Forces' Tank Capability

Cold War tanks of Germany
Leopard
Military vehicles introduced in the 1960s
Main battle tanks of the Cold War
History of the tank